Maynard Wayne Glitman (December 8, 1933 – December 13, 2010) was an American diplomat. Glitman negotiated the Intermediate-Range Nuclear Forces Treaty in 1987. 
Later, Glitman served as the United States Ambassador to Belgium from 1988 to 1991.

Early life and education
Glitman was born in Chicago, Illinois on December 8, 1933 to Reada and Ben Glitman. He earned a bachelor's degree with highest honors from the University of Illinois in 1955, where he was a member of Phi Beta Kappa. Glitman later completed a master's degree in 1956, from the Tufts University, Fletcher School of Law and Diplomacy.

Career
Glitman started his 38-year career in the U.S. Foreign Service in 1956. During that time, he served in the Departments of State and Defense in Washington, D.C., and in numerous other positions. In Washington, he served as Deputy Assistant Secretary of State for International Trade Policy, and also as Deputy Assistant Secretary of Defense for International Security Affairs.

Glitman's early foreign postings included Nassau, Bahamas, Ottawa, Canada and Paris, France. In 1977, he was assigned as Deputy Chief of Mission at the United States Mission to NATO in Brussels, Belgium.

In 1981, he became intensely involved in Arms Control issues as the Deputy Chief negotiator in the Intermediate-Range Nuclear Forces negotiation in Geneva, Switzerland. 
During the hiatus in the talks caused by the walk out of the Soviet delegation, he was posted to Vienna, Austria where he served as the Chief United States Representative, to the Mutual and Balanced Force Reduction Negotiations. When the INF talks resumed six months later, President Reagan called him to return to Geneva and lead the delegation in renewed talks with the Soviet Union. 
Those talks successfully concluded in 1987, when the U.S. Senate ratified the INF treaty eliminating an entire class of nuclear weapons, a significant achievement in the ending of the Cold War. His last posting as Ambassador to the Kingdom of Belgium concluded a long and successful career in service to his country.

Later life and death
After retiring from the Foreign Service, Ambassador Glitman wrote articles for many foreign affairs publications, served as diplomat in residence and an adjunct political science professor at the University of Vermont.

Glitman died after a struggle with dementia in Vermont, on December 13, 2010, at the age of 77.

Awards
In recognition of his work, he was awarded the Presidential Distinguished Public Service Award in 1989 and Presidential Meritorious Public Service Award in 1987 and 1984. The Department of Defense awarded him the Outstanding Public Service Medal in 1980 and its Meritorious Public Service Medal in 1977.

Works
 The Last Battle of the Cold War, Palgrave Macmillan, 2006.

Notes

External links

1933 births
2010 deaths
People from Chicago
University of Illinois alumni
Ambassadors of the United States to Belgium
Deaths from dementia in Vermont
Writers from Chicago
United States Foreign Service personnel